The Sleepy Jackson are an Australian alternative rock band formed in Perth, Western Australia. The band's name was inspired by a former drummer who was narcoleptic. The band revolves around the distinctive vocal style of multi-instrumentalist and songwriter Luke Steele. Stemming from a musical family, Luke's father Rick Steele is a local blues musician, and two of Luke's siblings are also musicians, with brother Jesse a former member of The Sleepy Jackson (and currently performing with father Rick in The Hot Biscuit Band), and sister Katy, who fronts another Perth rock band, Little Birdy. While a series of acclaimed EPs brought The Sleepy Jackson to a broader musical attention of Australia, it was the release of their 2003 album Lovers and 2006 second album Personality – One Was a Spider, One Was a Bird that directed significant international focus upon the band.

History

1998–2002 : Formation and early EP
The Sleepy Jackson formed in 1998 with the original lineup featuring Luke Steele (vocals and guitars), Jesse Steele (drums), and Matthew O'Connor (bass). This lineup recorded a self-titled debut EP and a subsequent single titled "Miniskirt." Both recordings were independently released. Dan Bull joined the lineup in 1999 as the band's first live keyboard player (who later played keys with Eskimo Joe at their live performances).

In 2000, as a result of non-musical commitments, Luke suggested that his brother should redirect his attentions and concentrate on other happenings in his life which ultimately resulted in Jesse following his advice and departing the band.

The void created by Jesse Steele's departure was filled by Paul Keenan (who later drummed with Eskimo Joe at their live performances). Along with numerous shows in their hometown of Perth, in late 2000 The Sleepy Jackson toured nationally with Jebediah. In March 2001, on the eve of the band's signing with EMI Records, the band toured with Magic Dirt and Motor Ace with Ronan Charles on keyboards joining Steele, O'Connor and Keenan. Five weeks into the tour, with the band broke, exhausted, and sleeping in caravan parks rather than enjoying the luxuries their touring partners were enjoying, O'Connor, Keenan and Charles quit, leaving Luke Steele to complete the tour solo.

Upon signing to EMI in 2000, pressure was soon placed on Steele to produce a recording. The result was the 2001 EP titled Caffeine in the Morning Sun, which Steele recorded in Sydney with a collection of session musicians. In addition to playing solo, Steele recruited drummer Malcolm Clark into The Sleepy Jackson fold and, when some serious touring was required in support of the release, the services of Justin Burford (guitar) and Rodney Aravena (bass) were enlisted. In addition to The Sleepy Jackson, Steele's three colleagues were also playing around their hometown with Jonathon Dudman under the name End of Fashion.

The Sleepy Jackson relocated to Sydney, where they recorded another EP, Let Your Love Be Love, in late 2002. Songs from this EP and Caffeine in the Morning Sun were compiled together to form a self-titled mini-album for release in the UK market in February 2003. A period of extensive touring quickly followed, which saw the band playing in Australia, the United States, and Europe. The latter brought the band some very enthusiastic attention from UK music magazine NME.

2003–2005: Lovers
In between live appearances, The Sleepy Jackson worked on recordings that were to become their debut album Lovers, which was released in June 2003. During a series of UK appearances in 2003, Burford and Aravena left the band. With a support slot for Silverchair's Diorama tour looming back in Australia, replacements were quickly sought. Clarke called upon the only other End of Fashion member not previously part of The Sleepy Jackson, Jonathon Dudman.

Dudman joined the band in Sydney, where he took over bass duties, and the second guitarist position was filled by session musician Ben Nightingale. The Sleepy Jackson's revolving door continued when Nightingale was ultimately replaced by Jonathon Dudman's brother, Julian Dudman. But the Dudmans subsequently left the band, leaving Luke Steele and Malcolm Clark as the only official members of The Sleepy Jackson.

In 2005, singer-songwriter Ben Lee referenced The Sleepy Jackson in his hit song "Catch My Disease".

2006–2007: Personality – One Was a Spider, One Was a Bird
The Sleepy Jackson released their second studio album Personality – One Was a Spider, One Was a Bird in Australia on 1 July 2006, where it debuted at number 10 on the Australian Albums Chart the following week. Later that July, the album was nominated for a J Awards. 
The band supported the new album's worldwide release with a series of live appearances in select markets. Joining Steele and Clark were Dave Symes and Felix Bloxsom, who both worked on the album, and Lee Jones who was formerly in the Perth band Spencer Tracy. Bloxsom has since been replaced by Luke's brother Jake and Luke's wife Jodi, a.k.a. "Snappy Dolphin," which also brought a change from organic percussion instruments to computer samples backing the band.

In 2007, The Sleepy Jackson performed at the 2007 Big Day Out, the Southbound festival, the Falls Festival and the St. Jerome's Laneway festivals in Melbourne, Sydney, and Brisbane. Also in 2007, Steele provided slide guitar to the song "Waiting All Day" by Silverchair on their fifth album Young Modern. Steele also appeared on the Pnau single "With You Forever," leading Nick Littlemore to state on Pnau's website "...working with Luke Steele... it was amazing, that inspired [me] to work on a separate project with him all together. It's another album we're doing."

The Sleepy Jackson contributed to Yoko Ono's album Yes, I'm a Witch, in 2007 with a remix of the song "I'm Moving On".

2008 onwards
The status of the band following the completion of touring for the second album is uncertain, with the band's official website no longer active. However, as of 2012, the band remains listed on the "Artists" page of the EMI Music website.

In late May 2013, as part of an interview for the second Empire of the Sun album Ice on the Dune, Steele revealed that a third Sleepy Jackson album was heard by the band's record label but a lack of subsequent interest meant that it was never released. As of 22 May 2013, Steele is focused on completing a collaboration with fellow Australian musician Daniel Johns and promotion for Ice on the Dune, with the latter released on 14 June 2013. Steele stated that he intends to release the third album prior to 2023 and that a release date during 2013 was highly unlikely. Meanwhile, Clark completed a tour as the drummer of Australian artist Bob Evans's backing band in mid-May 2013.

Side projects
In late 2007, Steele formed the electropop duo Empire of the Sun with Littlemore. Empire of the Sun's released its debut album Walking on a Dream, in addition to two single releases, "Walking on a Dream" and "We Are the People"—the project gained success in Australia, New Zealand, the United Kingdom (UK), Ireland and some parts of Europe in 2008. At the 2009 Australian Recording Industry Association Music (ARIA) Awards, Empire of the Sun received four awards: "Best Group", "Album of the Year", "Single of the Year" and "Best Pop Release".

As of May 2013, Steele stated that he is completing a recording project that he commenced with Johns at his Newcastle, Australia studio in 2008. In a 2013 interview, Steele explained: "Me and Daniel Johns have been in the studio working on our record, and we’re just about ready to try and finish that off. The sessions we did lately sound a bit like The Clash, Talking Heads … inspired by African music. So it’s going to be good to do some tougher, hard-edged kind of stuff.” In 2008 the name of the project was "Hathaway and Palmer", according to a radio interview that Steele conducted, but this has not been confirmed since.

In early 2009, Clark joined The Exploders, a Melbourne-based band, whose members include former Sleepy Jackson bassist Jonathon Dudman (aka J. Cortez). In 2010, Clark and Dudman joined Jeff Martin of The Tea Party in a new band, "Jeff Martin 777"—the band released its debut album The Ground Cries Out in early 2011.

Clark has undertaken the role of drummer in the touring band of Australian singer-songwriter Kevin Mitchell's "Bob Evans" moniker. Clark has joined Mitchell during the tours for the albums Goodnight Bull Creek! and Familiar Stranger.

Current band members
 Luke Steele – vocals, guitar (1998–present)
 Malcolm Clark – drums, backing vocals (2001–present)
 Lee Jones – guitar, keyboards, backing vocals (2006–present)
 Dave Symes – bass, backing vocals (2006–present)
 Jake Steele – computer samples (2007–present)
 Jodi "Snappy Dolphin" Steele – computer samples (2007–present)

Past members
 Jesse Steele – drums (1998–2000)
 Matt O'Connor (deceased) – bass (1998–2001)
 Dan Bull – Keyboards (1999–2001)
 Paul Keenan – drums (2000–2002)
 Ronan Charles – keyboards (2001)
 Justin Burford – guitar (2001–2004)
 Rodney Aravena – bass (2001–2004)
 Ben Nightingale – guitar (2003)
 Jonathan Dudman (aka J. Cortez) – bass (2003–2005)
 Julian Dudman (aka Jules Cortez) – guitar (2004–2005)
 Felix Bloxsom – percussion, acoustic guitar, synthesizer (2006–2008)

Discography

Studio albums

EPs

Compilations

Singles

Awards and nominations

ARIA Awards
The ARIA Music Awards is an annual awards ceremony that recognises excellence, innovation, and achievement across all genres of Australian music. 

|-
| rowspan="5"| 2003
| rowspan="3"| Lovers
| Album of the Year
| 
|-
| Breakthrough Artist – Album
| 
|-
| Best Rock Album
| 
|-
| "Vampire Racecourse"
| Breakthrough Artist – Single
| 
|-
| Jonathan Burnside for Lovers
| Producer of the Year
| 
|-
| 2004
| "Good Dancers" (directed by Nash Edgerton)
| ARIA Award for Best Video
| 
|-
| rowspan="2"| 2006
| Personality – One Was a Spider, One Was a Bird
| Album of the Year
| 
|-
| Luke Steele, James Bellesini, Love Police for Personality – One Was a Spider, One Was a Bird
| Best Cover Art
| 
|-
|}

J Awards
The J Awards are an annual series of Australian music awards that were established by the Australian Broadcasting Corporation's youth-focused radio station Triple J. They commenced in 2005.

|-
| J Award of 2006
| Personality – One Was a Spider, One Was a Bird
| Australian Album of the Year
| 
|-

West Australian Music Industry Awards
The Western Australian Music Industry Awards (commonly known as WAMis) are annual awards presented to the local contemporary music industry, put on by the Western Australian Music Industry Association Inc (WAM). The Sleepy Jackson have won two awards.

 (wins only)
|-
| 2001
| The Sleepy Jackson
| Most Popular Original Country Act 
| 
|-
| 2003
| Let Your Love Be Love
| Most Popular Local Original Single or EP
| 
|-

References

Western Australian musical groups
Astralwerks artists
Australian rock music groups